Sir Amberson Barrington Marten (1870–1962) was a Chief Justice of the Bombay High Court.

Career
Amberson Barrington Marten, known by his middle name, was the elder son of Sir Alfred Marten. He passed M.A. and LL.D. and started practice in the Law Courts in England and in 1916 he came to Bombay in British India to fill the vacancy created by the death of Sir Dinshaw Davar. He was appointed Puisne Judge from 1916 to 1926.

Barrington Marten had knowledge of English law, both principles and case laws. In 1926, he was elevated as the Chief Justice of The Bombay High Court after Sir Norman Cranstoun Macleod. 

Barrington Marten was knighted in 1924 and retired in 1930.

References

1870 births
1962 deaths
Knights Bachelor
British India judges
20th-century English judges
Chief Justices of the Bombay High Court
20th-century Indian judges
English barristers